Live from Mountain Stage may refer to:

 Live from Mountain Stage (John Hartford recording) 
 Live from Mountain Stage (Laura Nyro recording)